Loch Inver is a  long sea loch in Assynt, Sutherland and is on the northwest coast of Scotland. The loch meets the coastal embayment of Enard Bay at the north end and The Minch, where it meets Soyea Island at its mouth.

Geography
At the head of the bay is Soyea Island.

Gallery

References

Inver
Inver catchment
Landforms of Sutherland
Inver